The Francis J. Child House is an historic house at 67 Kirkland Street in  Cambridge, Massachusetts.  It is a two-story wood-frame structure, with a mansard roof, wooden clapboard siding, and a porch extending across the main facade.  The house was built in 1861, and is a distinctive Second Empire cottage with jigsaw-cut molding over its gable windows.  The lower (steep) portion of the mansard roof has hexagonal tiles, and the building retains its original siding.

The house was listed on the National Register of Historic Places in 1983, and included in the Shady Hill Historic District in 1986.

See also
National Register of Historic Places listings in Cambridge, Massachusetts

References

Houses completed in 1861
Houses on the National Register of Historic Places in Cambridge, Massachusetts
Second Empire architecture in Massachusetts
Historic district contributing properties in Massachusetts
1861 establishments in Massachusetts
National Register of Historic Places in Cambridge, Massachusetts
Buildings with mansard roofs